The following is a list of players, both past and current, who appeared at least in one game for the Tainan TSG GhostHawks (2021–present) franchise.



Players

A

B

C

D

F

G

H

K

L

P

R

T

U

W

References

T1 League all-time rosters